The West Bengal Council of Higher Secondary Education (WBCHSE) came into existence in 1975. It is an autonomous examining authority, which is responsible for conducting examinations for standard XII for both government and private schools affiliated to this board. It is responsible for improvement and promotion of education in the state. WBCHSE conducts the West Bengal Higher Secondary (Class 12) Examinations each year, for which more than 8 Lakh students appear across the state.

See also
 West Bengal Board of Secondary Education
 School Education Department, West Bengal
 West Bengal Board of Madrasah Education

References

External links

Education in West Bengal
State secondary education boards of India
1929 establishments in India
Educational boards based in Kolkata
State agencies of West Bengal